Francis McCaffrey may refer to:
 Fran McCaffery, American college basketball coach 
 Frank McCaffrey, American football player and coach
 Francis J. McCaffrey, American lawyer and politician from New York
 Francis J. McCaffrey Jr., American lawyer and politician from New York